John Wong may refer to:

John Wong Pan-yang (1910–?), Chinese-American aviator who served in the Chinese Air Force
John Huang Xinrui or John Wong Sun-shui (1914–1941), Chinese-American aviator who served in the Chinese Air Force
John Wong Soo Kau (born 1968), Malaysian Roman Catholic bishop
John Wong (Neighbours), fictional character from the Australian soap opera Neighbours
Jonathan Wong (born 1986), American-born Hong Kong singer and actor

See also
John Wang (disambiguation)